State Route 396 (SR 396), commonly referred to as Saturn Parkway, is a  east–west primary state route located in the city of Spring Hill in the U.S. state of Tennessee. The entire route is a controlled-access highway, and provides direct access between the General Motors Spring Hill Manufacturing plant and Interstate 65, as well as the business district of Spring Hill. It takes its name from Saturn Corporation, a subsidiary of General Motors that operated the plant from 1990 to 2007 as its sole manufacturing facility.

Route description

SR 396, most commonly known as Saturn Parkway, is a divided four-lane access-controlled facility its entire length. Its primary purpose is to provide access between the General Motors (GM) automotive assembly plant and Interstate 65, as well as residential and commercial areas within Spring Hill. Annual average daily traffic (AADT) volumes on the parkway range from nearly 45,000 vehicles per day near its eastern terminus to more than 35,000 vehicles per day at the western terminus. SR 396 is one of few non-interstate highways in the state with a  speed limit, which is allowed on all controlled-access highways in Tennessee.

SR 396 officially begins in the center of a three-level combination interchange with U.S. Route 31 (US 31) southwest of the business district of Spring Hill and west of the GM plant. This interchange contains two loop ramps and one flyover ramp, and utilizes separate ramps to provide access to and from US 31 northbound and southbound from both directions. A short distance later, it has a diamond interchange with Port Royal Road, before shifting slightly northward and reaching its eastern terminus with I-65 at a trumpet interchange along the Maury-Williamson County line.

History
The Tennessee Department of Transportation (TDOT) announced plans to build SR 396 on September 11, 1985, for a price of $29.3 million (equivalent to $ in ) as part of an effort to improve infrastructure around the then-future Saturn Plant, which had been announced three months prior. At the time, Spring Hill was a small agricultural community of approximately 1,000 residents. The environmental impact statement for the route was approved by the Federal Highway Administration (FHWA) on October 17, 1986. Contracts to construct SR 396 were awarded in November 1987, and construction began the following month. The parkway opened on August 7, 1989, in a ribbon-cutting ceremony officiated by then-Governor Ned McWherter. The final construction cost of the parkway was $37 million (equivalent to $ in ). The GM plant began operations the following year.

Since the route's completion and the opening of the GM plant, Spring Hill has grown to contain more than 50,000 residents and continues to rapidly expand, necessitating improvements to the Saturn Parkway and other roads in the area. While technically not part of SR 396, this extension retains the Saturn Parkway name, and was constructed to improve traffic flow around the north end of the GM plant. The project also involved modifying the interchange with US 31 and widening and intersection improvements on SR 247. It was completed in September 2020. In 2019, traffic signals were installed at the interchange with Port Royal Road. On October 29, 2021, a ceremony was held designating the bridges over Kedron Road as the J.B. Napier and Shirley Napier Memorial Bridge, in honor of a former state representative and his wife.

Major intersections

Notes

References

External links

Tennessee Department of Transportation
City of Spring Hill Website

396
Transportation in Maury County, Tennessee
Freeways in Tennessee
General Motors